Lucien Sciuto (1868–1947) was a Jewish educator, writer and journalist. Born in Thessaloniki, Ottoman Empire, he worked for various publications in Istanbul and founded a magazine-turned-newspaper L'Aurore which was published in Istanbul and then, in Cairo between 1909 and 1941 with five-year hiatus.

Early life and education
Sciuto was born in Thessaloniki in 1868 into a religious family. He attended the Alliance Israélite Universelle school which he left at age 14.

Career and activities
Sciuto worked for the newspapers in his hometown, including Journal de Salonique and Le Moniteur Oriental. His literary career began in 1884 when he published a poetry book entitled Poèmes misanthropiques. He published another poetry book in French and in 1894 he published another book in Paris in 1894, Paternité. In 1909 he founded a French language newspaper, L'Aurore, in Istanbul which was published there until 1919. 

Sciuto left Istanbul due to his problems with local Jewish leaders and settled in Palestine. There he contributed various Hebrew newspapers. In 1924 he began to live in Cairo and relaunched L'Aurore as a weekly magazine. In Cairo he joined the  Société d’Études Historiques Juives d’Égypte and published poems in the literary magazine, including n L’Égypte Nouvelle.

Due to financial problems Sciuto left the magazine to his friend, Jacques Maleh, in 1931. Scito died in Alexandria in 1947.

References

19th-century journalists
20th-century journalists
19th-century poets from the Ottoman Empire
20th-century poets from the Ottoman Empire
1868 births
1947 deaths
French-language poets
Jewish journalists
Jewish poets
Jews from Thessaloniki
Writers from Thessaloniki